The Shandong Provincial Sports Centre Stadium is a multi-purpose stadium located in the Shandong Provincial Sports Centre() of Jinan, Shandong, People's Republic of China. It is currently used mostly for football matches. The stadium holds 43,700 and was built in 1988.

International Matches

Asian Cup 2004

External links
Stadium picture

See also
Shandong Arena

Football venues in China
AFC Asian Cup stadiums
Multi-purpose stadiums in China
Shandong Taishan F.C.
Sports venues in Shandong